Qaleh-ye Shur (also Romanized as Qal‘eh-ye Shūr, Qal‘eh-e Shūr, and Qal‘eh Shūr; also known as Qal‘eh-ye Shūr Zar) is a village in Keraj Rural District, in the Central District of Isfahan County, Isfahan Province, Iran. At the 2006 census, its population was 242, in 71 families.

References 

Populated places in Isfahan County